Johann Gottlob Lehmann (1782–1837) was an expert in classical studies and noted  director of the Gymnasium at Luckau, Germany (1836–41).

References
 A History of Classical Scholarship v3: 18th c in Germany. by John Edwin Sandys, Cambridge, 1903, 1908 Ed. (Octavo.), 1908. Hardcover.
 A Short History of Classical Scholarship: From the Sixth Century B.C. to the Present Day, by John Edwin Sandys, 455 pages, Cambridge University Press, 1915. Hardcover.
 Above also collected in more widespread three volume set: A History of Classical Scholarship, In Three Volumes, by Sir John Edwin Sandys. Reprinted editions in 1921, 1958, 1967, 1997 (re: Volume III : The Eighteenth century in Germany, and the Nineteenth century in Europe and the United States of America.)

External links
 A history of classical scholarship by John Edwin Sandys

Notes

1782 births
1837 deaths
German classical scholars